Crescentino is a comune (municipality) in the Province of Vercelli in the Italian region Piedmont, located about  northeast of Turin and about  southwest of Vercelli.

Crescentino borders the following municipalities: Brusasco, Fontanetto Po, Lamporo, Livorno Ferraris, Moncestino, Saluggia, Verolengo, and Verrua Savoia.

Twin towns — sister cities
Crescentino is twinned with:

  San Giorgio Albanese, Italy
  Gmina Łososina Dolna, Poland

People
 Luigi Arditi (1822–1903), violinist and composer
 Bartolomeo Caravoglia (active 1660–1673), painter of the Baroque period
 Fiorenza Cossotto (born 1935), operatic mezzo-soprano
 Domenico Serra, (1899–1965), stage and film actor

References

External links
Official website